Eunice Makepeace Towle ( – ) was an American portrait painter.  Her subjects included US Presidents John Quincy Adams, James K. Polk, and Martin Van Buren.  

Eunice Makepeace was born on May 4, 1806 in Norton, Massachusetts, the daughter of Lysander and Sarah Makepeace.  She married Dr. Nathaniel C. Towle in 1831.  Their children included George Makepeace Towle, lawyer, author, and translator of Jules Verne.

Dr. Towle encouraged John Quincy Adams to sit for a portrait by her.  Adams could be quite caustic in his diary about artists, and he wrote about Towle "Her portrait of me painted in October 1837 is hideous....the word applicable to all her works is not paint, but daub."  Adams also loaned Towle Gilbert Stuart's portrait of his father John Adams, which she copied.  The location of her portrait of John Quincy Adams is unknown.

Eunice Makepeace Towle died on October 19, 1894 in Andover, Massachusetts.

References

External links
 http://www.artnet.com/artists/eunice-makepeace-towle/ 

Created via preloaddraft
1806 births
1894 deaths
19th-century American women artists
American portrait painters
19th-century American painters
American women painters
People from Norton, Massachusetts
Painters from Massachusetts